The Film (stylized in all caps) is the first video album by Japanese duo Yoasobi. It was released through Sony Music Entertainment Japan on March 23, 2022, on Blu-ray exclusively. It consists of the duo's 2021 three concerts: Keep Out Theater, Sing Your World, and Nice to Meet You (day 2); and the enlarged version of the MBS TV's documentary program Jōnetsu Tairiku, starring Yoasobi, broadcast in December 2021.

Background and release

On January 26, 2022, Yoasobi announced to release the video album, titled The Film, on March 23. It contains two Blu-ray discs on bookbinder of the duo's three-concert films held in 2021–the first livestream concert, Keep Out Theater; the collaboration with Uniqlo's UT free livestream concert, Sing Your World; and the second day of their first in-person concert Nice to Meet You, the enlarged version of the Yoasobi episode of Jōnetsu Tairiku, a documentary program airing at MBS TV, which was broadcast in December 2021, and a photobook taken during the concerts.

To commemorate the release, the duo teases three concerts with four performances uploaded via YouTube: "Ano Yume o Nazotte" from Keep Out Theater on February 15, "Gunjō" from Sing Your World on March 1, and "Moshi mo Inochi ga Egaketara" and "Tsubame" from Nice to Meet You on March 8 and the release date, respectively.

Commercial performance

The Film debuted atop both the Oricon Blu-ray Disc Chart, and the Music DVD and Blu-ray Chart, selling 21,000 copies in its first week.

Track listing

Notes
 Track 1–8 of disc 1 is noted as "2021.2.14 Yoasobi 1st Online Live "Keep Out Theater" at Shinjuku Milano Former Site"
 Track 9–17 of disc 1 is noted as "2021.7.4 UT×Yoasobi Online Live "Sing Your World" at Uniqlo Ariake Headquarters / Uniqlo City Tokyo"
 Track 1–15 of disc 2 is noted as "2021.12.5 Yoasobi Live at Budokan "Nice to Meet You" at Nippon Budokan"

Charts

Certifications and sales

Release history

References

2022 video albums
Japanese-language video albums
Live video albums
Sony Music Entertainment Japan albums
Albums recorded at the Nippon Budokan
Yoasobi albums